This is a list of all participating squads of the 2010 FIVB Volleyball Men's World Championship, held in several cities in Italy from 25 September to 10 October 2010.

Squads

The following is the Argentine roster in the 2010 FIVB Volleyball Men's World Championship.

The following is the Australian roster in the 2010 FIVB Volleyball Men's World Championship.

The following is the Brazilian roster in the 2010 FIVB Volleyball Men's World Championship.

The following is the Bulgarian roster in the 2010 FIVB Volleyball Men's World Championship.

The following is the Canadian roster in the 2010 FIVB Volleyball Men's World Championship.

The following is the Chinese roster in the 2010 FIVB Volleyball Men's World Championship.

The following is the Cameroonian roster in the 2010 FIVB Volleyball Men's World Championship.

The following is the Cuban roster in the 2010 FIVB Volleyball Men's World Championship.

The following is the Czech roster in the 2010 FIVB Volleyball Men's World Championship.

The following is the Egyptian roster in the 2010 FIVB Volleyball Men's World Championship.

The following is the French roster in the 2010 FIVB Volleyball Men's World Championship.

The following is the German roster in the 2010 FIVB Volleyball Men's World Championship.

The following is the Iranian roster in the 2010 FIVB Volleyball Men's World Championship.

The following is the Italian roster in the 2010 FIVB Volleyball Men's World Championship.

The following is the Japan roster in the 2010 FIVB Volleyball Men's World Championship.

The following is the Mexican roster in the 2010 FIVB Volleyball Men's World Championship.

The following is the Polish roster in the 2010 FIVB Volleyball Men's World Championship.

The following is the Puerto Rican roster in the 2010 FIVB Volleyball Men's World Championship.

The following is the Russian roster in the 2010 FIVB Volleyball Men's World Championship.

The following is the Serbian roster in the 2010 FIVB Volleyball Men's World Championship.

The following is the Spanish roster in the 2010 FIVB Volleyball Men's World Championship.

The following is the Tunisian roster in the 2010 FIVB Volleyball Men's World Championship.

The following is the American roster in the 2010 FIVB Volleyball Men's World Championship.

The following is the Venezuelan roster in the 2010 FIVB Volleyball Men's World Championship.

External links
Official website

S
FIVB Volleyball Men's World Championship squads